Surviving the Law is the 25th studio album by Scottish hard rock band Nazareth. It was released on 15 April 2022 by Frontiers Records and produced by Yann Rouiller who also worked with Nazareth on their previous albums, Tattooed on My Brain (2018), The Newz (2008) and Rock 'n' Roll Telephone (2014). It is the second Nazareth album to feature vocalist Carl Sentance. Original singer Dan McCafferty had given his blessings to Nazareth's new singer and left the band in 2014 citing health issues.

Reception

Aaron Badgley of Spill Magazine compares this to Tattooed on My Brain, their prior album. "Surviving the Law has a rougher edge. Here the band is much less polished" and he continues, "It is heavy metal, and at times they are dipping their toes in grunge."

Track listing

Personnel
Nazareth
Carl Sentance – lead vocals, backing vocals
Pete Agnew – bass guitar, backing vocals
Jimmy Murrison – guitars, backing vocals
Lee Agnew – drums, percussion, backing vocals

Additional musicians
Ronnie Leahy – Organ on "You Made Me"
Suzy Cargill – Djembe on "Let the Whisky Flow"

Charts

References 

2022 albums
Nazareth (band) albums